Local elections were held in the province of Bohol on May 10, 2010, as part of the 2010 general election.  Voters elected candidates for all local positions: a city or town mayor, vice mayor and town councilors, three to four members of the Sangguniang Panlalawigan, the vice-governor, governor, and representatives for the three district of Bohol. Bohol had posted an approximate total of 736,468 eligible voters based on the latest count after the deadline set on October 31, 2009, compared to a total of 695,445 voters in the 2007 election. A total of 610,494, or 82.89%, cast their votes during the election day.

The administration Lakas-Kampi-CMD bets for the top provincial posts made a sweeping victory in all the three congressional districts as the first automated elections drew the final results. Edgardo Chatto and his running mate, former provincial board member Concepcion Lim, won with a remarkable margins over rivals. The three congressional seats in the province were also won by Lakas-Kampi-CMD candidates, namely former Gov. Rene Relampagos for the first district, Gov. Erico Aumentado for the second district and former Department of Agriculture Secretary Arthur Yap for the third district.

Results
The candidates for governor and vice governor with the highest number of votes wins the seat. They are voted separately, and therefore may be from different parties when elected.

Gubernatorial election results
Parties are as stated in their certificate of candidacies. The total number of voters was 610,494.

Vice gubernatorial election results
Parties are as stated in their certificate of candidacies. The total number of voters was 610,494.

Congressional elections
Each of Bohol's three legislative districts had elections for the House of Representatives. The candidate with the highest number of votes wins the seat.

1st District, Candidates for Congressman
Edgar M. Chatto (Lakas-Kampi-CMD) was the incumbent, but ineligible for re-election because he was already in his third consecutive term. Former governor Rene Relampagos ran in his place under the Laban ng Demokratikong Pilipino, and Lakas-Kampi-CMD also supported his candidacy.

2nd District, Candidates for Congressman
Roberto Cajes was the incumbent, but ineligible for re-election since he was already in his third consecutive term. Lakas-Kampi-CMD initially nominated Erico B. Aumentado as their candidate, but Aumentado was expelled from the party because of his alleged association with Manny Villar, the presidential nominee of the rival Nacionalista Party. Lakas-Kampi-CMD then sent a certificate of nomination to incumbent congressman Cajes' wife Judith.

3rd District, Candidate for Congressman
Adam Relson Jala (Lakas-Kampi-CMD) was the incumbent but decided not to run for a second term. Instead, he ran for provincial vice governorship but then dropped his candidacy to support his uncle, Elpidio Jala, who was also running for vice governor. Secretary of Agriculture Arthur Yap ran unopposed, the only cabinet official not facing opposition.

Sangguniang Panlalawigan elections
Both the 1st and 2nd District of Bohol elected three Sangguniang Panlalawigan, or provincial board members. The 3rd District, with the highest population, elected four board members. The candidates with the highest number of votes win the seats allocated for each district, with the number of winning candidates per district equal to the number of seats that district sends to the provincial legislature.

1st District
City: Tagbilaran City
Municipality: Alburquerque, Antequera, Baclayon, Balilihan, Calape, Catigbian, Corella, Cortes, Dauis, Loon, Maribojoc, Panglao, Sikatuna, Tubigon
Population (2007):  400,026
Parties are as stated in their certificate of candidacies.

|bgcolor=black colspan=5|

2nd District
City: none
Municipality: Bien Unido, Buenavista, Clarin, Dagohoy, Danao, Getafe, Inabanga, Pres. Carlos P. Garcia, Sagbayan, San Isidro, San Miguel, Talibon, Trinidad, Ubay
Population (2007):  404,026
Parties are as stated in their certificate of candidacies.

|bgcolor=black colspan=5|

3rd District
City: none
Municipality: Alicia, Anda, Batuan, Bilar, Candijay, Carmen, Dimiao, Duero, Garcia Hernandez, Guindulman, Jagna, Lila, Loay, Loboc, Mabini, Pilar, Sevilla, Sierra Bullones, Valencia
Population (2007):  425,502
Parties are as stated in their certificate of candidacies

|bgcolor=black colspan=5|

Mayoral Elections
All municipalities of Bohol and Tagbilaran City elected mayors and vice-mayors in this election. The candidates for mayor and vice mayor with the highest number of votes won seats, and were voted separately.  Therefore, they may belong to different parties when elected. Below is the list of mayoralty candidates of each city and municipalities for each district. Out of 47 towns and one city, Tagbilaran City, 22 mayors were reelected to their position and 26 were elected as new mayors.  There were 37 male and 11 females elected as city or town executive. On the other hand, 34 were elected as new vice mayors and 14 incumbents were reelected. The new vice mayors included six incumbent mayors who slid down and won.

1st District, candidates for Mayor
City: Tagbilaran City
Municipality: Alburquerque, Antequera, Baclayon, Balilihan, Calape, Catigbian, Corella, Cortes, Dauis, Loon, Maribojoc, Panglao, Sikatuna, Tubigon

Tagbilaran City
The total number of voters was 40,690. Defeated vice mayor Jose Antonio Veloso filed a protest at the Commission on Elections in Manila against re-elected Mayor Dan Neri Lim after claiming that there were irregularities in the May 10 polls. Lim won in all 15 barangays of the city including Booy, also the home barangay of Veloso. Nuevas Tirol-Montes was also reelected as vice mayor.

Alburquerque
The total number of voter was 5,383.  Jet Jose Ugdoracion was also reelected as vice mayor.

Antequera
The total number of voters was 7,319. Jose Mario Pahang became the newly elected mayor and Liliosa Nunag was also reelected as vice mayor.

Baclayon
The total number of voters was 9,342. Both Alvin Uy and Jodel Theodore Cabahug were reelected as mayor and vice mayor of the town.

Balilihan
The total number of voters was 8,516. Dominisio Chatto became the newly elected mayor while Efren Chatto was reelected as vice mayor.

Calape
The total number of voters was 16,024. Incumbent mayor Sulpicio Yu Jr. was reelected as town mayor together with his brother Nelson Yu, who also won as vice-mayor over their rivals.

Catigbian
The total number of voters was 11,108. Both Roberto Salinas and Reynald Lacea were reelected as mayor and vice mayor of the town.

Corella
Total number of voters was 3,938. Both Epifanio Bolando and Vito Rapal were reelected as mayor and vice mayor of the town.

Cortes
Total number of voters was 8,437. Both Apolinaria Balistoy and Danilo Montero were reelected as mayor and vice mayor of the town.

Dauis
The total number of voters was 18,024. Jaime Jimenez became the newly elected mayor while Allan Coloma was reelected as vice mayor.

Loon
The total number of voters was 20,117. Lloyd Peter Lopez became the newly elected mayor while Edwin Ladeza was reelected as vice mayor.

Maribojoc
The total number of voters was 10,222. Both Leoncio Evasco and Fructuoso Redulla Jr. were reelected as mayor and vice mayor of the town.

Panglao
The total number of voters was 15,440. Both Benedicto Alcala and Evangeline Lazaro were reelected as mayor and vice mayor of the town.

Sikatuna
The total number of voters was 3,998. Jose Ellorimo became the newly elected mayor while Julian Manigo was reelected as vice mayor.

Tubigon
The total number of voters was 21,861. Incumbent mayor Luna Piezas lost to William Jao by 16.9% of votes. However, Piezas said he will file a formal complaint before the local courts for alleged election fraud last May 10 polls. Piezas claimed he was a victim of a "pre-programmed compact flash card" which manipulated the results of the local elections in his hometown. William Jao became the newly elected mayor while Virgilio Fortich was reelected was vice mayor.

2nd District, Candidates for Mayor
City: none
Municipality: Bien Unido, Buenavista, Clarin, Dagohoy, Danao, Getafe, Inabanga, Pres. Carlos P. Garcia, Sagbayan, San Isidro, San Miguel, Talibon, Trinidad, Ubay

Bien Unido
The total number of voters was 11,557. Both Niño Rey Boniel and Justiniane Petronilo were reelected as mayor and vice mayor of the town.

Buenavista
The total number of voters was 13,747. Both Robert Celocia and Ronald Lowell Tirol were elected as the new mayor and vice mayor of the town.

Clarin
The total number of voters was 10,546. Allen Ray Piezas became the newly elected mayor while Hermogenes Diezon was reelected as vice mayor.

Dagohoy
The total number of voters was 8,631. Both Herminio Relampagos and Jemilo Puertos were reelected as mayor and vice mayor of the town.

Danao
The total number of voters was 8,289. Luis Thomas Gonzaga was reelected as mayor while Jose Cepedoza became the newly elected vice mayor.

Getafe
The total number of voters was 14,981. Cary Camacho became the newly elected mayor while Simon Torreon was reelected as vice mayor.

Inabanga
The total number of voters was 20,553. Jose Jono Jumamoy was reelected as mayor while Wenceslao Lao became the newly elected vice mayor.

Pres. Carlos P. Garcia
The total number of voters was 10,873. Tesalonica Boyboy was reelected as mayor while Nestor Abad became the newly elected vice mayor.

Sagbayan
The total number of voters was 11,390. Ricardo Suarez became the newly elected mayor while Charito Lao was reelected as vice mayor.

San Isidro
The total number of voters was 4,963. Jacinto Naraga became the newly elected mayor while Eudoxio Asoy was reelected as vice mayor.

San Miguel
The total number of voters was 10,811. Both Claudio Bonior and Jonathan Reyes were reelected as mayor and vice mayor of the town.

Talibon
The total number of voters was 24,890. Both Restituto Auxtero and Marcos Aurestila were reelected as mayor and vice mayor of the town.

Trinidad
The total number of voters was 14,123. Both Roberto Cajes and Francisco Gonzales were elected as the new mayor and vice mayor of the town.

Ubay
The total number of voters was 29,411. Eutiquio Bernales Sr. and Constantino Reyes were reelected as mayor and vice mayor respectively.

3rd District, Candidates for Mayor
City: none
Municipality: Alicia, Anda, Batuan, Bilar, Candijay, Carmen, Dimiao, Duero, Garcia Hernandez, Guindulman, Jagna, Lila, Loay, Loboc, Mabini, Pilar, Sevilla, Sierra Bullones, Valencia

Alicia
The total number of voters was 10,982. Both Marnilou Ayuban and Basilio Balahay were elected as the new mayor and vice mayor of the town.

Anda
The total number of voters was 8,634. Angelina Simacio became the newly elected mayor while Paulino Amper was reelected as vice mayor.

Batuan
The total number of voters was 6,663. Gregoria Pepito became the newly elected mayor while Antonino Jumawid was reelected as vice mayor.

Bilar
The total number of voters was 9,178. Norman Palacio became the newly elected mayor while Arnold Calamba was reelected as vice mayor.

Candijay
The total number of voters was 15,064. Incumbent mayor Sergio Amora Jr. was reelected as town mayor under Lakas-Kampi-CMD. While, his brother Rey Amora, an Independent also won as vice mayor.

Carmen
The total number of voters was 22,659. Conchita Toribio-delos Reyes became the newly elected mayor while Pedro Budiongan was reelected as vice mayor.

Dimiao
The total number of voters was 8,288. Sylvia Adame was reelected as mayor while Danilo Guivencan became the newly elected vice mayor.

Duero
The total number of voters was 9,594. Both Cornelius Ocay and Patton Olano were elected as the new mayor and vice mayor of the town.

Garcia-Hernandez
The total number of voters was 11,342. Miguelito Galendez became the newly elected mayor while Pio Salmasan was reelected as vice mayor.

Guindulman
The total number of voters was 15,452. Both Maria Fe Piezas and Maria Edineth Hohmann were reelected as mayor and vice mayor of the town.

Jagna
The total number of voters was 16,708. Fortunato Abrenilla Jr. became the newly elected mayor while Exuperio Lloren was reelected as vice mayor.

Lila
The total number of voters was 5,829. Both Regina Salazar and Frederick Raut were elected as the new mayor and vice mayor of the town.

Loay
The total number of voters was 9,710. Both Rosemarie Lim-Imboy and Paulino Tejano were reelected as mayor and vice mayor of the town.

Loboc
The total number of voters was 8,807. Leon Calipusan was reelected as mayor while Luisito Digal became the newly elected vice mayor.

Mabini
The total number of voters was 12,256. Esther Tabigue became the newly elected mayor while Stephen Rances was reelected as vice mayor.

Pilar
The total number of voters was 12,454. Both Wilson Pajo and Wilfredo Bernante Jr. were reelected as mayor and vice mayor of the town.

Sevilla
The total number of voters was 5,770. Ernesita Digal became the newly elected mayor while Simplicio Maestrado Jr. was reelected as vice mayor.

Sierra Bullones
The total number of voters was 11,929. Alfredo Gamalo became the newly elected mayor while Sinforiano Cutin was reelected as vice mayor.

Valencia
The total number of voters was 12,377. Henrietta Gan was reelected as mayor while Jorge Buslon became the newly elected vice mayor.

See also
 
 2010 Philippine barangay and Sangguniang Kabataan elections
 List of Barangays of Bohol, Philippines

References

External links
Patunayan Mo kung sinong karapatdapat sa posisyon - online debate
Official website of the Commission on Elections
Adam Carr's Election Archive
Election Files
A discussion forum about the Philippines' 2010 elections.
2010 Philippines Election Poll
Philippine News and Elections talk
User-contributed blog with opinions about the upcoming elections
Twitter Trending on the 2010 Philippine Elections
Philippine News and Videos Archive

2010 Philippine local elections
 

nl:Filipijnse verkiezingen 2010
tl:Pangkalahatang halalan sa Pilipinas, 2010